The following is a brief list of some of the major lakes in Yoho National Park. Yoho National Park is one of the major mountain parks in the Canadian Rockies.  The region has extraordinary topographical and hydro-graphical features, including significant peaks, waterfalls, lakes, and canyons.

Cathedral Lake
Duchesnay Lake
Emerald Lake
Fany Lake
Hidden Lake
Hungaman Lake
Kiwetinok Lake
Linda Lake
Mypole Lake
Mary Lake
McyDees Lake
Monica Lake
Morning Glory Lake
Opabin Lake
Lake McArthur
Lake Oesa
Lake O'Hara
Lake Pinas
Sherbrooke Lake
Wapta Lake
Yoho Lake

Gallery

Yoho National Park
Yoho National Park
Yoho
Lakes